Tang Chinese or Tangren and variants can refer to the following:

The people of the Tang dynasty of medieval China
Middle Chinese, the reconstructed prestige dialect of Tang China
Han Chinese people, particularly in southern Chinese dialects like Cantonese, Hakka, and Minnan.
Tangren Media, a Chinese media company

See also
Chinese (disambiguation)